Art & Language is an English conceptual artists' collaboration that has undergone many changes since it was created around 1967. The group was founded by artists who shared a common desire to combine intellectual ideas and concerns with the creation of art, and included many Americans.

From May 1969 the group published in England Art-Language The Journal of conceptual art.

History

The Art & Language group was founded around 1967 in the United Kingdom by Terry Atkinson (b. 1939), David Bainbridge (b. 1941), Michael Baldwin (b. 1945) and Harold Hurrell (b. 1940). The group was critical of what was considered mainstream modern art practices at the time. In their work conversations, they created gallery art and presented these ideas in a journal as part of their discussions.

The first issue of Art-Language: The Journal of Conceptual Art (Volume 1, Number 1) was published in May, 1969.

In 1972, the group created Index 01, consisting of 350 texts placed inside 8 filing cabinets. These texts were "indexed according to their logical and ideological (in)compatibility", to assert a "critical inquiry into art practice as an art activity in itself". The Art & Language group that exhibited in the international Documenta 5 exhibitions of 1972 included Atkinson, Bainbridge, Baldwin, Hurrell, Pilkington, Rushton, and Joseph Kosuth, the American editor of Art-Language. The work consisted of a filing system of material published and circulated by Art & Language members.

Projects

Ian Burn and Mel Ramsden co-founded The Society for Theoretical Art and Analysis in New York in the late 1960s. They joined Art & Language in 1970–71. During this time, Sarah Charlesworth and Christine Kozlov became affiliated with the group. New York Art & Language became fragmented after 1975 because of disagreements concerning principles of collaboration.
 

In the early years of the 1970s, several artists joined the collective, including Ian Burn, Michael Corris, Charles Harrison, Preston Heller, Joseph Kosuth, Andrew Menard, Mel Ramsden and Terry Smith, and David Rushton. During this time the group produced numerous theoretical writings and art works.

During the mid-1970s the group was in conflict during a time when conceptual art had lost some of its "critical bearing" and was being institutionalized. The conflicts among the collective existed within the context of global socio-political turmoil and economic crisis as well as the "revival of modernism."

By the end of the decade, the only members who remained were Baldwin, Harrison and Ramsden, with the occasional participation of Mayo Thompson and his group Red Crayola. Ian Burn returned to Australia, joining Ian Milliss, a conceptual artist who had begun work with trade unions in the early 1970s, in becoming active in Union Media Services, a design studio for social and community initiatives and the development of trade unions.

In 1976, Art & Language in collaboration with Thompson, released the LP Corrected Slogans.

In 1986, Art & Language was nominated for the Turner Prize.

Art & Language and the  collaborated for the first time in January 1995, during the "Art & Language & Luhmann" symposium, organized by the Contemporary Social Considerations Institute (Institut für Sozial Gegenwartsfragen) of Freiburg. The 3-day symposium included speakers such as Catherine David, who prepared the Documenta X, and Peter Weibel, artist and curator. There was also a theoretical installation of an Art & Language text produced in playback by the Jackson Pollock Bar. The installation was interpreted by five German actors playing the roles of Jack Tworkow, Philip Guston, Harold Rosenberg, Robert Motherwell and Ad Reinhardt.

An archive of papers relating to "New York Art & Language" are held at the Getty Research Institute, Los Angeles.

Critical reception
In 1999, Art & Language exhibited at PS1 MoMA in New York, with a major installation entitled The Artist Out of Work. This was a recollection of Art & Language's dialogical and other practices, curated by Michael Corris and Neil Powell. In a negative appraisal of the exhibition, art critic Jerry Saltz wrote, "A quarter century ago, 'Art & Language' forged an important link in the genealogy of conceptual art, but next efforts have been so self-sufficient and obscure that their work is now virtually irrelevant."

In 2002, Beatriz Herráez, writing for Flash Art, described the Art & Language retrospective exhibition, Too Dark to Read as "declaration meant to ‘clarify’ the group’s practice" as a method that is located in "the discursive quality of its ideational system and never in isolated works."

Adrian Searle wrote in 2014: "Art & Language is as much as anything a conversation from which work arises and goes off on its own tangent, referencing itself, dragging Art & Language’s compendious history with it as it goes. Their's is an art that makes and unmakes itself, eats and regurgitates itself."

Members and associates 
Members and associates include Terry Atkinson, David Bainbridge, Michael Baldwin, Kathryn Bigelow, Ian Burn, Sarah Charlesworth,Charles Harrison, Michael Corris,Preston Heller, Graham Howard, Harold Hurrell,Joseph Kosuth, Christine Kozlov, Nigel Lendon, Andrew Menard, Philip Pilkington, Neil Powell, Mel Ramsden, David Rushton, Terry Smith, and Mayo Thompson.

Public collections

References

External links 

 Interview with Michael Baldwin and Mel Ramsden about Art & Language (2011) MP3
 Art & Language: Blurting in A & L online Hypertext version of a complete print work of 1973 by American members of Art & Language, with articles and a discussion forum.

Further reading
 Bailey, Robert. Art & Language International, Duke University Press, 
 Thomas Dreher: Intermedia Art: Konzeptuelle Kunst with four German articles on Art & Language and a chronology with illustrated works.
 Morton,Tom.  Art & Language, Frieze, April 2002.
 El análisis crítico de la modernidad de Art & Language

 
British conceptual artists
English artist groups and collectives
English contemporary artists
Conceptual art
Art movements
Postmodern artists